Strachocin may refer to the following places in Poland:
Strachocin, Lower Silesian Voivodeship (south-west Poland)
Strachocin, West Pomeranian Voivodeship (north-west Poland)